Penstemon hartwegii, common name Hartweg's beardtongue,  is a species of flowering perennial herb in the plantain family.

Description
This bushy semi-evergreen plant has simple, narrow, fleshy, mid-green leaves and racemes of bell-shaped bright-red, purple or crimson flowers, up to 4 cm long, with white markings on a wide throat. They bloom in summer and early autumn.

It has gained the Royal Horticultural Society's Award of Garden Merit.

Distribution
This species is native to Mexico.

References

hartwegii
Flora of Mexico